The list of Australian Touring Car Championship Races is a list of all the races or rounds which have been held in the combined 60-year history of the Australian Touring Car Championship, V8 Supercars Championship and Supercars Championship.

As of the end of the 2020 season, 1055 championship races have been held since the first race at the Gnoo Blas Motor Racing Circuit in 1960. Since then, the 1,000th championship race was held at the Albert Park Circuit in March 2019. Sandown Raceway has hosted the most events, with 49, while Wanneroo Raceway, Perth has hosted the most individual races, with 88. 78 different drivers have won an ATCC/Supercars championship race. Jamie Whincup has won the most championship races, with 113 victories.

List of races

Results 1960–1984 sourced from:
Results 1996–2008 sourced from:

1960s

1970s

1980s

1990s

2000s

2010s

2020s

Statistics

Milestone rounds

Milestone races

Rounds by circuit

See also
 Australian Touring Car Championship
 Supercars Championship

Notes

References

Supercars Championship
Races
Lists of sports events in Australia